Justice Indrajit Mahanty (born 11 November 1960) is an Indian judge. He is former Chief Justice of Tripura High Court and Rajasthan High Court and Judge of Bombay High Court and Orissa High Court.

References 

 

Indian judges
1960 births
Living people